Before the Acts of Union 1707, the barons of the shire of Lanark elected commissioners to represent them in the unicameral Parliament of Scotland and in the Convention of the Estates. The number of commissioners was increased from two to four in 1690.

From 1708 Lanarkshire was represented by one Member of Parliament in the House of Commons of Great Britain.

List of shire commissioners

See also
 List of constituencies in the Parliament of Scotland at the time of the Union

References
Return of Members of Parliament, Part II (1879) pp. 550–600.

Constituencies of the Parliament of Scotland (to 1707)
Constituencies disestablished in 1707
1707 disestablishments in Scotland
Politics of Lanarkshire